Davis, also known as Davistown or Davis Switch, is an unincorporated community in Atascosa County, in the U.S. state of Texas. According to the Handbook of Texas, the community had a population of 8 in 2000. It is located within the San Antonio metropolitan area.

History
Davis was named for rancher M. M. Davis, who was given a land grant for the San Antonio, Uvalde, and Gulf Railroad in 1914. A post office named Daviston was established in the community in 1925 and remained in operation until 1929, with Joe Key as the first postmaster. The community had a factory, two more businesses, and a few scattered homes in the 1940s, and by the 1980s, only a few homes remained. Its population was eight in 2000.

Geography

Education
Davis is served by the Charlotte Independent School District.

References

Unincorporated communities in Atascosa County, Texas
Unincorporated communities in Texas